Wenzelia is a genus of flowering plants belonging to the family Rutaceae.

It is native to the Philippines, New Guinea, Solomon Island and Fiji.

Known species
As accepted by Plants of the World Online:

Taxonomy
The genus name of Wenzelia is in honour of Chester A. Wenzel (1882–1929), an American teacher, cattle rancher and plant collector in the Philippines. 
It was first described and published in Philipp. J. Sci., Section C, Vol.10 on page 272 in 1915.

References

Aurantioideae
Aurantioideae genera
Plants described in 1915
Flora of the Philippines
Flora of Papuasia
Flora of Fiji